Katherine J. Cramer is an American political scientist. She is a professor in the political science department at the University of Wisconsin–Madison and director of the Morgridge Center for Public Service.

Career
Cramer is the author of The Politics of Resentment, the fruit of almost a decade of studying political attitudes in rural Wisconsin through ethnography. She argues that "rural consciousness" acts as a basis for rural residents to form a social identity and as a lens through which they "think about themselves, other people, and public affairs." According to Cramer, a driver of political sentiment in rural Wisconsin is the beliefs among voters that "I’m not getting my fair share of power, stuff or respect" and "All the decisions are made in Madison and Milwaukee and nobody’s listening to us". Cramer has found this "rural resentment" comes partly from changes to rural life and partly from massive changes in the economy. Rural people, she asserts, feel overlooked and disrespected by elites; they work hard, yet they see the "good life" is passing them by, which is one reason why they voted for Donald Trump in the 2016 election.

Publications
Some published under the name Katherine Cramer Walsh

Honors and awards
 Heinz I. Eulau Award - 2018
 American Academy of Arts and Sciences Fellow - 2019

References

External links
Interview with Cramer on The Politics of Resentment (Wisconsin Public Television, video with transcript)
Interview with Cramer following the 2020 election (PBS, video)

Living people
Date of birth missing (living people)
University of Wisconsin–Madison faculty
American women political scientists
American political scientists
Writers from Wisconsin
1970 births
American women non-fiction writers
21st-century American non-fiction writers
21st-century American women writers
People from Grafton, Wisconsin
American women academics
Fellows of the American Academy of Arts and Sciences